Fruitvale is a census-designated place (CDP) in and governed by Mesa County, Colorado, United States. It is part of the Grand Junction, CO Metropolitan Statistical Area. The population was 8,271 at the 2020 census, up from 7,675 in 2010. The Grand Junction post office (Zip Code 81504) serves Fruitvale postal addresses.

Geography
Fruitvale is in central Mesa County, bordered to the west by the city of Grand Junction and to the east and south by unincorporated Clifton. Interstate 70 forms the northern edge of the Fruitvale CDP, and U.S. Route 6 forms the southern edge.

Climate

Demographics

See also

 List of census-designated places in Colorado

References

External links

 Fruitvale, Colorado Mining Claims And Mines 
 Mesa County website

Census-designated places in Mesa County, Colorado
Census-designated places in Colorado